Roy Lerner (born 1954 in Chicago, Illinois) is an internationally exhibited American painter.

Lerner attended Franconia College where he studied with the artist Peter Bradley. Early in his career Lerner was a gallery assistant to the British sculptor Anthony Caro. In 1987 he exhibited in a group exhibition the Fall Invitational at the Aldrich Museum of Contemporary Art in Ridgefield, Connecticut with Ross Bleckner, Barry Le Va, Keung Szeto, Gary Stephan, and Deborah Remington.

Lerner was a member of the New New Painters a group of artists brought together by the first curator of modern and contemporary art at the Boston Museum of Fine Arts, Dr. Kenworth Moffett (1934-2016), in 1978, contemporaneously with the further advancement of acrylic gel paint as developed by the paint chemist Sam Golden.  Lerner is also considered a trailblazer in the visual genre of hypertexture.

Lerner has taught at the Katonah Art Center and in 2019 he spoke and conducted a workshop at the Stamford Museum & Nature Center in Stamford, Connecticut.

References

Living people
1954 births
20th-century American painters
American male painters
21st-century American painters
21st-century American male artists
20th-century American male artists